Holbrook may refer to:

Places

England
Holbrook, Derbyshire, a village
Holbrook, Somerset, a hamlet in Charlton Musgrove
Holbrook, Sheffield, South Yorkshire, a former mining village in Mosborough ward, now known as Halfway
Holbrook, Suffolk, a village
Holbrook, Horsham, West Sussex
Holbrook (electoral division), a West Sussex County Council constituency
Holbrook, a tributary of the River Tame, West Midlands

United States
Holbrook, Arizona, a city
Holbrook, Idaho, an unincorporated community
Holbrook, Massachusetts, a town
Holbrook, Nebraska, a village
Holbrook, New York, a hamlet and census-designated place
Holbrook, Oregon, an unincorporated community
Holbrook, Pennsylvania, an unincorporated community
Holbrook, West Virginia, an unincorporated community
Lake Holbrook (disambiguation)

Elsewhere
Holbrook, New South Wales, a town
Holbrook Creek, Yukon, Canada
Holbrook, Sri Lanka, a village

People
Holbrook (name), a list of people with the given name or surname

Other uses
Holbrook Academy, Suffolk, a secondary school
Holbrook Company, American manufacturer of automobile bodies, established in 1908
Holbrook High School (Arizona)
Holbrook-Palmer Estate, Atherton, California
Holbrook railway line, New South Wales, Australia

See also
Holbrooke (disambiguation)
Holbrooks, a residential area of Coventry, West Midlands, England
Dr. Holbrook's Military School, New York, a former school